Zacorisca stephanitis is a species of moth of the family Tortricidae. It is found on Flores in Indonesia.

The wingspan is 30–32 mm. The forewings are bright orange, but blue blackish at the base. The hindwings are bright orange with a purple-blackish streak along the dorsum. The apical fifth is purple blackish.

References

	

Moths described in 1910
Zacorisca